Agathangelos Tsiripidis (born 4 May 1963) is a Greek boxer. He competed in the men's bantamweight event at the 1996 Summer Olympics.

References

1963 births
Living people
Greek male boxers
Olympic boxers of Greece
Boxers at the 1996 Summer Olympics
Place of birth missing (living people)
Bantamweight boxers
Sportspeople from Tbilisi
20th-century Greek people